Robert Wardlow Oxspring,  (22 May 1919 – 8 August 1989) was a Royal Air Force officer and flying ace of the Second World War.

Early life and family
Oxspring was born in Hampstead, London on 22 May 1919. His father, also named Robert, had served in No. 54 Squadron RFC, and was a founder member and commander of No. 66 Squadron RFC during the First World War, in which he was credited with several aerial victories, and was twice awarded the Military Cross before being wounded in action during a mid-air collision on 30 April 1917.

Military career

Oxspring was granted a short service commission as an acting pilot officer on 7 May 1938, being described at the time as "a tallish, good-looking, fair-headed bloke", and served in No. 66 Squadron RAF. He was regraded to pilot officer on 7 March 1939.

Flying throughout the Battle of Britain, Oxspring was promoted to flying officer on 3 September 1940, and on 25 October was shot down in Spitfire X4170 near Capel, Kent. Known as one of the battle's great aces, he was one of the fraction of The Few selected by Fighter Command to have a portrait drawn by Cuthbert Orde, sitting for it on 9 December 1940.

On 8 November 1940 he was awarded the Distinguished Flying Cross (DFC). The citation read:

Promoted to flight lieutenant (war substantive) on 3 September 1941, he became flight commander in No. 41 Squadron RAF, and went on to command No. 91 Squadron RAF at RAF Hawkinge, No. 222 Squadron RAF and No. 24 Wing.

He was awarded a Bar to his DFC on 18 September 1942, with the citation:

Moving to Mediterranean combat, it is thought probable that Oxspring was the pilot who shot down renowned German ace Anton Hafner of JG 51 on 2 January 1943.

Having led his squadron to be the highest scoring in the North African theatre, and survived his second shooting down of the war, Oxspring was awarded a second Bar to his DFC in February 1943, with the citation reading:

On 1 January 1944 he was promoted to temporary squadron leader, and was promoted to squadron leader (war substantive) on 15 June 1944. the rank he held when the conflict ceased in 1945.

During the war he had registered 13 solo kills with 2 shared, 2 probable kills and 4 solo V-1 flying bombs destroyed and 1 shared.

After the war, on 10 January 1947, he was one of the British officers given royal recognition of the award of the Dutch Airman's Cross. He was also awarded the 1939–1945 Star with Battle of Britain clasp, the Air Crew Europe Star with France and Germany clasp, the Italy Star, and the War Medal 1939–1945.

He stayed on in the RAF, receiving a permanent commission as a flight lieutenant on 1 September 1945, and being promoted to substantive squadron leader on 1 August 1947.

He was awarded the Air Force Cross on 1 January 1949, after leading No. 54 Squadron RAF Vampires to Canada and the US, the first jet aircraft to cross the Atlantic.

On 22 September 1949 he led a flight of five Vampire Mk.3 aircraft from 73 Squadron RAF on a tour of Italy to promote the aircraft to the Italian Air force. Flying VF345 Oxspring with a broken radio was unable to find the airfield at Malpensa. Almost out of fuel he chose to land in a field with the other four Vampires also out of fuel following him. All five pilots made successful landings without any serious injuries.

Promotion came twice more, to wing commander on 1 January 1953, and finally group captain on 1 January 1960.

He was appointed Station Commander of RAF Gatow in Berlin, where a section of the fence was the Berlin Wall. He retired on 23 February 1968.

Later life
Oxspring wrote the book Spitfire Command (1984, William Kimber & Co Ltd (publisher)], ; republished 2003 by Cerberus).

Oxspring died on 8 August 1989, and is buried at Cranwell Parish church, Lincolnshire.

References

1919 births
1989 deaths
Military personnel from London
People from Hampstead
Royal Air Force group captains
British World War II flying aces
The Few
Recipients of the Air Force Cross (United Kingdom)
Recipients of the Airman's Cross
Recipients of the Distinguished Flying Cross (United Kingdom)